The 2022–23 season is the 128th season in the history of Eintracht Braunschweig and their first season back in the second division. The club are participating in the 2. Bundesliga and DFB-Pokal.

Players

Squad

Transfers

In

Out

Pre-season and friendlies

Competitions

Overall record

2. Bundesliga

League table

Results summary

Results by round

Matches 
The league fixtures were announced on 17 June 2022.

DFB-Pokal

References

Eintracht Braunschweig seasons
Eintracht Braunschweig